is a Japanese actor and singer. He is best known for his role as Ryoma Echizen in The Prince of Tennis musical series (commonly known as Tenimyu). He was also part of a young men's stage acting troupe, D-BOYS, which perform in various skit-like performances.

Career
Endo's first major onscreen debut was for the 2000 film, Juvenile. He also was a part of the Watanabe net drama, Hice Cool (2005), appearing alongside fellow D-Boy members, Kotaro Yanagi, Yuu Shirota, and Osamu Adachi.

On November 16, 2005, Endo released an Idol DVD called Ao no Kiseki.

Endo also appeared, as a member of The Tigers in the TV drama, The Hit Parade, which aired May 26, 2006 on Fuji TV and co-starred fellow D-BOYS members Masato Wada, Yuu Shirota, Masaki Kaji, Hirofumi Araki, Hiroki Suzuki and Kōji Seto.

In September, 2006, he, along with fellow D-BOYS member, Yuu Shirota, appeared in the music video for RAG FAIR's "Kimi no Tame ni Boku ga Tate ni Naro", playing a DJ in love with his co-host. As a member of the D-BOYS, Endo also keeps a blog, which he updates occasionally.

Being a part of the D-Boys provides Endo with a lot of opportunities. Among them was to perform with the group of boys and expand his experience as a performer.

The D-BOYS so far have released two Photobooks. The first photobook released on April 27, 2005 was self-titled D-Boys, while the second, released on March 15, 2006 was called Start, both which contain many photos of Endo. The D-boys have also starred in their own drama documentary variety series called, DD-Boys in which Endo has appeared in every episodes as himself because the skits revolve around Endo playing himself with fellow D-BOYS member, Kotaro Yanagi also playing himself, as they try to live in the D-house while the other D-Boys drop by. The show was 23 episodes long and ran from April 10 to September 25, 2006.

In June 2007, the D-BOYS starred in their very own musical together called, D-BOYS STAGE, which ran from June 3 to June 10 at the Space Zero theater in Tokyo.  Endo appeared in the musical as a regular performer for the run of the musical. Right now, he is the current group leader of D-BOYS.

As Ryoma Echizen in The Prince of Tennis Musicals
Endo was brought into Tenimyu as a replacement for fellow D-BOY member Kotaro Yanagi, who had been injured in a car accident, as the main protagonist Ryoma Echizen. Prior to his casting, J-pop singer Kimeru, who was playing the role of Shusuke Fuji, had filled as Echizen for a show. Endo made his debut as Echizen during the Dream Live 1st concert and would play the role while Yanagi was recovering. He also shared the role with Yanagi after his recovery in two shows: Side Fudomine ~Special Match~ and Dream Live 2nd; Endo did all of the dance and tennis match choreography while Yanagi did stand still scenes due to his injuries. During his run in the musicals, Endo was able to work with other fellow D-BOYS members Masaki Kaji, Hiroki Suzuki, Osamu Adachi, Hirofumi Araki, Masato Wada, and former member Yuu Shirota.

On May 4, 2005, after the final performance for the Dream Live 2nd concert, Endo graduated from his role. Yanagi would carry on as Echizen with the second generation Seigaku cast. During the last performance of Dream Live 3rd, Endo, along with Kimeru and Takashi Nagayama (who played Eiji Kikumaru with the first cast), went to see Yanagi graduate from Tenimyu.

Personal life

Endo keeps a blog on his D-Boys webpage, which he updates occasionally.

Selected filmography

Television

Film

Official DVDs

Stage
 March 21 to April 1, 2007 in the Out of Order Live Entertainment Show

D-BOYS
 June 3 to June 10, 2007 as a regular performer in the D-BOYS STAGE Musical

Musicals
TENIMYU: THE PRINCE OF TENNIS MUSICAL SERIES (as Ryoma Echizen)
 The Prince of Tennis Musical: Dream Live 1st (2004)
 The Prince of Tennis Musical: More Than Limit St. Rudolph Gakuen (2004)
 The Prince of Tennis Musical: Side Fudomine ~Special Match~ (shared the role with a returning Kotaro Yanagi) (In Winter of 2004-2005)
 The Prince of Tennis Musical: Side Yamabuki feat. St. Rudolph (In Winter of 2004-2005)
 The Prince of Tennis Musical: Dream Live 2nd (he again shared the role with Yanagi) (2005)

References

Wikipedia Japanese article on 遠藤雄弥
Wikipedia Japanese article on D-Boys

External links
Endo's Official Blog 
Endo's Official Website and Profile 
Endo's Official Friendster Profile 
Endo's Past Blog Archive 
Endo's Past Blog Archive with Introduction 
D-Boys Official Website

See also
 D-Boys
 Tenimyu
 Juvenile
 The Prince of Tennis
 Ryoma Echizen

1987 births
Living people
Japanese male child actors
Japanese male film actors